Jillian Shane "Jill" Levin (born October 13, 1961) is an American bridge player from New York City. She has won major tournaments as Jillian Blanchard as well as Jill Levin. Sometime prior to the 2014 European and World meets (summer and October), she ranked 6th among 73 Women World Grand Masters by world masterpoints (MP) and 10th by placing points that do not decay over time.

Levin has won 3 world championships and 12 North American Bridge Championships NABC-rated events.

Levin is an attorney and has graduated from the University of Michigan and Columbia University. She is married to Bobby Levin, is the former wife of Bob Blanchard and the daughter of Gail Greenberg and Steve Shane, all of them successful bridge players.

Bridge accomplishments

Wins

 Venice Cup (3) 2003, 2007, 2013 
 Buffett Cup (3) 2006, 2010, 2012
 North American Bridge Championships (12)
 Rockwell Mixed Pairs (1) 1994 
 Smith Life Master Women's Pairs (1) 2005 
 Machlin Women's Swiss Teams (4) 2002, 2005, 2009, 2011 
 Wagar Women's Knockout Teams (4) 1995, 2000, 2001, 2012 
 Sternberg Women's Board-a-Match Teams (2) 2004, 2011

Runners-up

 World Mixed Pairs Championship (1) 2006
 North American Bridge Championships
 Silodor Open Pairs (1) 2011 
 Machlin Women's Swiss Teams (1) 2000 
 Wagar Women's Knockout Teams (5) 1997, 1998, 2002, 2004, 2007 
 Sternberg Women's Board-a-Match Teams (3) 2006, 2009, 2010 
 Mitchell Board-a-Match Teams (1) 2013 
 Reisinger (1) 1989

References

External links
 

1961 births
American contract bridge players
Venice Cup players
Columbia University alumni
University of Michigan alumni
Lawyers from New York City
Living people
Date of birth missing (living people)
Place of birth missing (living people)